Pat Irwin (1921–1993) was a judge in Oklahoma. He served as a Justice on the state Supreme Court from 1958 to 1983, including two terms as Chief Justice (1969–1970) and (1981–1982).

He was born June 21, 1921, in Leedey, Oklahoma to Marvin J. and Olive D. Irwin. Irwin studied at Southwestern State College ,
He served as the Dewey County Attorney in 1949–1950), then served in the Oklahoma Senate from 1950 through 1954. He also served as Secretary of the Oklahoma School Land Commission and as a member of the Western States Land Commission between 1955 and 1958.

Irwin was appointed as a justice on the Oklahoma State Supreme Court, where he served from 1959 to 1983, representing District 4, including two terms as Chief Justice (1969–1970 and 1981–1982).  Retiring from the Oklahoma Supreme Court in 1983, he was appointed magistrate for the United States District Court for the Western District of Oklahoma. In early 1990, he was listed as one of the ex officio, non-voting members in a report to the court authorities in Washington, D. C. He retired from this position on September 1, 1999.

An obituary indicated that Pat Irwin died on Tuesday, March 16, 1993, in Edmond, Oklahoma.

Notes

References 

1921 births
1993 deaths
People from Dewey County, Oklahoma
People from Oklahoma City
University of Oklahoma College of Law alumni
Justices of the Oklahoma Supreme Court
20th-century American judges